Eugenio Renazzi also surnamed Renazzi del Castello (Rome, 1863- 1914) was an Italian painter, painting genre and Orientalist subjects.

He lived in Rome. He studied at the Academy of Fine Arts of Florence. He exhibited in Florence: Dopo il veglione; In Villa; Portrait; and Sentinella araba.

References

1863 births
1913 deaths
19th-century Italian painters
Italian male painters
Orientalist painters
Painters from Florence
20th-century Italian painters
Accademia di Belle Arti di Firenze alumni
19th-century Italian male artists
20th-century Italian male artists